The 2021 United Women's Soccer season is the 27th season of pro-am women's soccer in the United States, and the fifth season of the UWS league.

Standings

Central Conference

East Conference

Midwest North Conference

Midwest South Conference

Southeast Conference

Southwest Conference

West Conference

Playoffs

References

External links 
 

2021
1